Cherryland Center (formerly Cherryland Mall) is an outdoor shopping mall in Traverse City, Michigan. Opened in 1976 as an enclosed mall, it was renovated as an outdoor property in 1999. From 2018 until June 2022, the center's sole anchor store was Big Lots. TC Curling Center acquired the old Kmart building and began renovations and opened the space up to tours of the demolition. TC Curling Center opened in January 2023. Although it is often referred to as a "dead mall", the Cherryland Center, as of January 2023, had an occupancy rate over 90 percent. 
K1 Speed is set to open in the former Sears space by June 2023, with the hopes of Sky Zone opening in the remainder of the Sears space at a later time.

History

In April 1976, the first tenants for Cherryland Mall were confirmed: a Kmart discount store, a Kroger supermarket, and a branch of Michigan National Bank. Kmart opened in November 1976, followed by Kroger in December. The same month, H. C. Prange Co. (now Younkers) and Sears had been confirmed as the other anchors. The Sears store replaced a catalog merchant located downtown. By late 1977, the rest of the mall was opened. Peripheral development the same year included two smaller strip malls and a Zantigo fast food restaurant.

In 1998, plans were announced to demolish the interior mall portion while leaving all four anchors intact. Under these plans, the Sears and Younkers stores would also be expanded. As part of this renovation, Sears expanded its store into the western third of the mall in 1999. When renovation was complete, the center was converted to an outdoor mall. The mall was foreclosed on by Wells Fargo in 2010; also, Tom's Food Market, which had taken over the supermarket space in 1986, closed. In June 2011, the space became Big Lots.

On June 6, 2017, Sears Holdings announced that Kmart would be closing as part of a plan to close 72 stores nationwide. The store closed in September 2017.

On April 18, 2018, it was announced that Younkers would also be closing as parent company The Bon-Ton is going out of business. The store closed August 2018.

On May 31, 2018, Sears Holdings announced that Sears would be closing as well in September 2018 as part of another plan to close 72 stores nationwide. The closures of both Younkers and Sears left Big Lots as the only anchor. In 2020, a brand new Wendy's opened in an outlot of the Cherryland Center.
In March 2022, it was announced local market Cherry Republic would be purchasing a building in downtown Traverse City that houses Studio Anatomy. Studio Anatomy launched a campaign to raise funds to acquire and move into the old Younkers space. This venue would include: a large live performance venue, vinyl records shop, craft brewery, recording studio, art gallery, and leasable artist studios. On June 8, 2022, TC Curling Club announced they had closed on a $7 million deal to acquire the old Kmart building. In the fall of 2022, TC Curling Club changed their name to TC Curling Center, which will be the second anchor store, along with Big Lots.
In June 2022, Biggby Coffee began construction on a drive-thru only location in the Cherryland Center parking lot. In July 2022, it was announced that Arkansas-based chain 7 Brew Coffee was planning their first Michigan locations, both in Garfield Township. 7 Brew purchased their property at the Cherryland Center in November 2022. 7 Brew Coffee will replace the vacant Hometown Pharmacy location in between Big Lots and the new Biggby Coffee.

In August 2022, TC Curling Center opened to members for board meetings and tours of the new facility. It opened for full use in January 2023. 
In December 2022, it was announced go-kart company K1 Speed would be transforming the empty Sears location. The owner of the new facility plans to use the front portion for the racing facility with hopes to bring a Sky Zone trampoline park to the back portion of the building. Biggby Coffee opened on December 6, 2022.

In January 2023, it was announced Starbucks was going into an outlot of the Cherryland Center, along with additional retail space

References

Shopping malls in Michigan
Buildings and structures in Grand Traverse County, Michigan
Shopping malls established in 1976